Belevren is a village in Sredets Municipality, in Burgas Province, in southeastern Bulgaria. The village borders the following villages: Gorno Yabalkovo, Dolno Yabalkovo, Granichar and Kirovo. The southern border of the village coincides with the state border of Bulgaria with Turkey.    

After the Ilinden–Preobrazhenie Uprising in 1903 was populated with Bulgarian refugees. Near the village have been found ancient Thracian dolmens.

Geography
The village is located in the Strandja mountain. 4 km south of the village lies the Arabadzhi bayr, which is as high as the highest peak of the mountain Strandja in Bulgaria - 709,6 m.

The Belevrenska river, which is 24 km of length, runs through the village. The river is part of the basin of the Fakiya river, which then flows into the Black Sea.

References

Villages in Burgas Province